Christopher Allen Camozzi (born November 20, 1986) is an American professional Glory kickboxer and mixed martial artist who competes in the Light heavyweight division. A professional MMA competitor since 2006, Camozzi has formerly competed in the Middleweight division of the Ultimate Fighting Championship, MFC, Shark Fights, HDNet Fights, and was also a contestant on Spike TV's 11th season of The Ultimate Fighter in 2010.

Background
Camozzi is from Alameda, California and competed in wrestling and rugby in high school. Camozzi then continued his rugby career at Fort Lewis College but soon dropped out and headed back home to train in Muay Thai and Brazilian jiu-jitsu. A coach of Camozzi's, who had fought in some of the earlier UFC events, asked Camozzi if he was interested in mixed martial arts, and Camozzi soon began his career.

Mixed martial arts career

Early career
Camozzi fought former Ultimate Fighter competitor Jesse Taylor for the King of Champions Middleweight Championship. After three rounds, the judges declared Taylor the winner, giving him the title.

The Ultimate Fighter
Camozzi signed to take part in the eleventh season of the Ultimate Fighter. Camozzi's preliminary fight to get into the house was against Victor O'Donnell. After three hard-fought rounds between the two of them, Camozzi was declared the winner. However, the damage to both competitors was noticeable, with O'Donnell walking away with a severely fractured orbital bone and Camozzi entering the house with a broken jaw.

This damage to Camozzi proved to be the end of his run on the show, as during the third episode of the season, Dana White informed Camozzi that he had to withdraw from the competition due to his injury. Seth Baczynski stepped in as Camozzi's replacement.

Ultimate Fighting Championship
Though Camozzi was removed from the show, he fought at The Ultimate Fighter: Team Liddell vs. Team Ortiz Finale against James Hammortree. Camozzi won a unanimous decision (29–28, 30–27, 30–27).

Camozzi's next fight was at UFC 121 against Korean UFC newcomer Dongi Yang. Yang began the fight with a successful takedown, followed by ground-and-pound. After standing up, Camozzi was able to keep Yang at bay with kicks, before engaging in the clinch. However, Yang's thick neck and shoulders prevented effective attacks. Later, Camozzi was able to effectively time the advance of Yang. In the third, Yang began to tire and swing wildly, to no avail. Camozzi was declared the winner via split decision (29–28, 28–29, 29–28).

Camozzi faced off against Kyle Noke on February 27, 2011, at UFC 127. He lost the fight via rear-naked choke submission in the first round and was subsequently released from the promotion.

Shark Fights
Following his release from the UFC, Camozzi faced Joey Villaseñor at Shark Fights 15. The fight was initially ruled a draw, but was subsequently overturned and counted as a split decision win for Camozzi by the New Mexico Athletic Commission when it was revealed one of the judge's scores was added incorrectly.

Return to the UFC
It was announced on September 12 that Camozzi had re-signed with the UFC. He faced UFC newcomer Francis Carmont on October 29, 2011, at UFC 137. After a back and forth fight, Camozzi lost via unanimous decision.

In his next fight, Camozzi defeated Dustin Jacoby via third-round guillotine choke submission on January 28, 2012 at UFC on Fox 2.

Camozzi faced Nick Catone on June 22, 2012, at UFC on FX 4. In the third round, Camozzi struck Catone with a knee to the head opening a giant cut, causing the doctor to step in and force a TKO (doctor stoppage) at 1:51 of the third round.

Camozzi was expected to face Buddy Roberts on August 11, 2012, at UFC 150. However, Camozzi was injured and pulled out of the bout.

Camozzi fought Brazilian Luiz Cané on October 13, 2012, at UFC 153. He won the fight via unanimous decision.

Camozzi next faced Nick Ring on March 16, 2013, at UFC 158. He won the fight via split decision.

Camozzi was expected to face Cezar Ferreira on May 18, 2013, at UFC on FX 8, replacing an injured C.B. Dollaway. However, on April 7, Ferreira pulled out of the fight as well, citing an injury and was replaced by Rafael Natal. Then in early May, Camozzi was pulled from the matchup with Natal in favor of a matchup with Ronaldo Souza after Souza's scheduled opponent Costas Philippou pulled out of the bout with an injury. He lost the fight via technical submission due to an arm-triangle choke submission in the first round.

Camozzi next faced Lorenz Larkin on November 6, 2013, at UFC Fight Night 31. He lost the fight via unanimous decision.

Camozzi was expected to face Andrew Craig on April 11, 2014, at UFC Fight Night 39. However, the fight was cancelled on the day of the weigh-ins as Craig was ruled out with an illness.

Camozzi faced Bruno Santos on July 5, 2014, at UFC 175. He lost the fight via split decision.

A rescheduled bout with Rafael Natal took place on September 5, 2014, at UFC Fight Night 50. Natal defeated Camozzi via split decision.

After losing four consecutive fights Camozzi was released by the UFC for a second time.

Third UFC Stint
On the heels of two wins on the regional circuit, Camozzi replaced an injured Yoel Romero and faced Ronaldo Souza in a rematch on April 18, 2015, at UFC on Fox 15. He lost the fight via submission due to an armbar in the first round.

Camozzi faced Tom Watson on August 8, 2015, at UFC Fight Night 73. He won the fight by unanimous decision.

Camozzi next faced Joe Riggs on February 21, 2016, at UFC Fight Night 83. He won the fight via TKO in the first round due to a series of knees. He was also awarded a Performance of the Night bonus.

Camozzi faced Vitor Miranda on May 29, 2016, at UFC Fight Night 88. He won the fight by unanimous decision.

Camozzi faced Thales Leites on August 6, 2016, at UFC Fight Night 92. He lost the fight by submission due to a rear-naked choke in the third round.

Camozzi next faced Dan Kelly on November 27, 2016, at UFC Fight Night 101. He lost the fight via unanimous decision.

Camozzi was expected to face Magnus Cedenblad on May 28, 2017, at UFC Fight Night 109. However, Cedenblad was removed from the card on 27 March and replaced by Trevor Smith. He lost the fight by unanimous decision.

On June 2, 2017, Camozzi announced the expiry of his UFC contract and that he is now a free agent.

Absolute Championship Berkut 
Camozzi was scheduled to face Thiago Silva on June 16, 2018, at ACB 88 in Brisbane, Australia. However, the fight got canceled two days before the event due to Silva's visa complications.

He then faced Muslim Magomedov at ACA 93: Balaev vs Zhamaldaev on March 16, 2019. He lost the fight via third-round stoppage.

He faced Tony Lopez at SCL 76 on September 6, 2019. He won the fight via first-round submission.

Professional Fighters League

Camozzi faced 2019 PFL Light Heavyweight tournament winner Emiliano Sordi on April 29, 2021 at PFL 2 as the start of the 2021 PFL Light Heavyweight tournament. He lost a close back and forth bout via unanimous decision.

Camozzi faced Cezar Ferreira at PFL 5 on June 17, 2021. He won the bout via unanimous decision.

Camozzi faced Cory Hendricks on August 27, 2021 at PFL 9. He won the fight via unanimous decision.

Personal life
Camozzi previously owned and operated an MMA gear and clothing distribution company, Performance MMA, in Englewood, Colorado.

Championships and accomplishments
Ultimate Fighting Championship
Performance of the Night (One time) vs. Joe Riggs
Prize Fighting Championship
Prize FC Middleweight Championship (One time)
One successful title defense

Mixed martial arts record

|-
|Win
|align=center|27–15
|Cory Hendricks
|Decision (unanimous)
|PFL 9 
|
|align=center|3
|align=center|5:00
|Hollywood, Florida, United States
|
|-
|Win
|align=center| 26–15
|Cezar Ferreira
|Decision (unanimous)
|PFL 5 
|
|align=center| 3
|align=center| 5:00
|Atlantic City, New Jersey, United States
|
|-
|Loss
|align=center|25–15
|Emiliano Sordi
|Decision (unanimous)
| PFL 2
| 
| align=center| 3
| align=center| 5:00
| Atlantic City, New Jersey, United States
|
|-
| Win
| align=center| 25–14
| Tony Lopez
| Submission (arm-triangle choke)
| SCL 76
| 
| align=center| 1
| align=center| 3:11
| Golden, Colorado, United States
|
|-
| Loss
| align=center| 24–14
| Muslim Magomedov
| TKO (doctor stoppage)
| |ACA 93: Balaev vs Zhamaldaev 
| 
| align=center| 3
| align=center| 1:02
| St. Petersburg, Russia
|
|-
|Loss
|align=center|24–13
|Trevor Smith
|Decision (unanimous)
|UFC Fight Night: Gustafsson vs. Teixeira
|
|align=center|3
|align=center|5:00
|Stockholm, Sweden
|
|-
|Loss
|align=center|24–12
|Dan Kelly
|Decision (unanimous)
|UFC Fight Night: Whittaker vs. Brunson
|
|align=center|3
|align=center|5:00
|Melbourne, Australia
| 
|-
|Loss
|align=center|24–11
|Thales Leites
|Submission (rear-naked choke)
|UFC Fight Night: Rodríguez vs. Caceres
|
|align=center|3
|align=center|2:58
|Salt Lake City, Utah, United States
|
|-
|Win
|align=center|24–10
|Vitor Miranda
|Decision (unanimous)
|UFC Fight Night: Almeida vs. Garbrandt
|
|align=center|3
|align=center|5:00
|Las Vegas, Nevada, United States
| 
|-
|Win
|align=center|23–10
|Joe Riggs
|TKO (knees)
|UFC Fight Night: Cowboy vs. Cowboy
|
|align=center|1
|align=center|0:26
|Pittsburgh, Pennsylvania, United States
|
|-
|Win
|align=center|22–10
|Tom Watson
|Decision (unanimous)
|UFC Fight Night: Teixeira vs. Saint Preux
|
|align=center|3
|align=center|5:00
|Nashville, Tennessee, United States
|
|-
| Loss
| align=center| 21–10
| Ronaldo Souza
| Submission (armbar)
| UFC on Fox: Machida vs. Rockhold
| 
| align=center| 1
| align=center| 2:33
| Newark, New Jersey, United States
| 
|-
| Win
| align=center| 21–9
| Wes Swofford
| TKO (leg kick)
| Prize FC 8
| 
| align=center| 1
| align=center| 1:25
| Denver, Colorado, United States
| 
|-
| Win
| align=center| 20–9
| Jeremy Kimball
| Submission (rear-naked choke)
| Prize FC 7: Rock N' Rumble
| 
| align=center| 1
| align=center| 3:33
| Denver, Colorado, United States
| 
|-
| Loss
| align=center| 19–9
| Rafael Natal
| Decision (split)
| UFC Fight Night: Jacare vs. Mousasi
| 
| align=center| 3
| align=center| 5:00
| Mashantucket, Connecticut, United States
| 
|-
| Loss
| align=center| 19–8
| Bruno Santos
| Decision (split)
| UFC 175
| 
| align=center| 3
| align=center| 5:00
| Las Vegas, Nevada, United States
| 
|-
| Loss
| align=center| 19–7
| Lorenz Larkin
| Decision (unanimous)
| UFC: Fight for the Troops 3
| 
| align=center| 3
| align=center| 5:00
| Fort Campbell, Kentucky, United States
| 
|-
| Loss
| align=center| 19–6
| Ronaldo Souza
| Technical Submission (arm-triangle choke)
| UFC on FX: Belfort vs. Rockhold
| 
| align=center| 1
| align=center| 3:37
| Jaraguá do Sul, Brazil
| 
|-
| Win
| align=center| 19–5
| Nick Ring
| Decision (split)
| UFC 158
| 
| align=center| 3
| align=center| 5:00
| Montreal, Quebec, Canada
| 
|-
| Win
| align=center| 18–5
| Luiz Cané
| Decision (unanimous)
| UFC 153
| 
| align=center| 3
| align=center| 5:00
| Rio de Janeiro, Brazil
| 
|-
| Win
| align=center| 17–5
| Nick Catone
| TKO (doctor stoppage)
| UFC on FX: Maynard vs. Guida
| 
| align=center| 3
| align=center| 1:51
| Atlantic City, New Jersey, United States
| 
|-
| Win
| align=center| 16–5
| Dustin Jacoby
| Submission (guillotine choke)
| UFC on Fox: Evans vs. Davis
| 
| align=center| 3
| align=center| 1:08
| Chicago, Illinois, United States
| 
|-
| Loss
| align=center| 15–5
| Francis Carmont
| Decision (unanimous)
| UFC 137
| 
| align=center| 3
| align=center| 5:00
| Las Vegas, Nevada, United States
| 
|-
| Win
| align=center| 15–4
| Joey Villaseñor
| Decision (split)
| Shark Fights 15: Villaseñor vs Camozzi
| 
| align=center| 3
| align=center| 5:00
| Rio Rancho, New Mexico, United States
| 
|-
| Loss
| align=center| 14–4
| Kyle Noke
| Submission (rear-naked choke)
| UFC 127
| 
| align=center| 1
| align=center| 1:35
| Sydney, Australia
| 
|-
| Win
| align=center| 14–3
| Dongi Yang
| Decision (split)
| UFC 121
| 
| align=center| 3
| align=center| 5:00
| Anaheim, California, United States
| 
|-
| Win
| align=center| 13–3
| James Hammortree
| Decision (unanimous)
| The Ultimate Fighter: Team Liddell vs. Team Ortiz Finale
| 
| align=center| 3
| align=center| 5:00
| Las Vegas, Nevada, United States
| 
|-
| Win
| align=center| 12–3
| Chad Reiner
| Submission (anaconda choke)
| King of Champions: Rage
| 
| align=center| 2
| align=center| 4:55
| Denver, Colorado, United States
| 
|-
| Win
| align=center| 11–3
| Darin Brudigan
| Submission (triangle choke)
| VFC 27: Mayhem
| 
| align=center| 1
| align=center| 4:34
| Council Bluffs, Iowa, United States
| 
|-
| Loss
| align=center| 10–3
| Jesse Taylor
| Decision (unanimous)
| King of Champions: Shockwave 2009
| 
| align=center| 3
| align=center| 5:00
| Denver, Colorado, United States
| 
|-
| Win
| align=center| 10–2
| Victor Moreno
| Submission (guillotine choke)
| MTXAFN 2: Evolution
| 
| align=center| 2
| align=center| 0:31
| Las Vegas, Nevada, United States
| 
|-
| Win
| align=center| 9–2
| Elliot Duff
| Decision (unanimous)
| MFC 18: Famous
| 
| align=center| 3
| align=center| 5:00
| Edmonton, Alberta, Canada
| 
|-
| Loss
| align=center| 8–2
| Nick Rossborough
| Submission (triangle choke)
| Premier Championship Fighting 3
| 
| align=center| 3
| align=center| 2:46
| Longmont, Colorado, United States
| 
|-
| Win
| align=center| 8–1
| Dwayne Lewis
| Decision (unanimous)
| MFC 16: Anger Management
| 
| align=center| 3
| align=center| 5:00
| Edmonton, Alberta, Canada
| 
|-
| Loss
| align=center| 7–1
| Jesse Forbes
| Submission (armbar)
| MFC 15: Rags to Riches
| 
| align=center| 3
| align=center| 1:45
| Edmonton, Alberta, Canada
| 
|-
| Win
| align=center| 7–0
| Donnie Liles
| TKO (punches)
| Elite Fighting Extreme 1
| 
| align=center| 1
| align=center| 4:58
| Denver, Colorado, United States
| 
|-
| Win
| align=center| 6–0
| Tony Barker
| TKO (punches)
| RMBB & PCF 1
| 
| align=center| 2
| align=center| 2:22
| Denver, Colorado, United States
| 
|-
| Win
| align=center| 5–0
| Aaron Truxell
| Submission (rear-naked choke)
| Tap or Snap
| 
| align=center| 1
| align=center| 1:45
| Castle Rock, Colorado, United States
| 
|-
| Win
| align=center| 4–0
| Spencer Hooker
| Decision (split)
| Kickdown Classic 37
| 
| align=center| 3
| align=center| 5:00
| Loveland, Colorado, United States
| 
|-
| Win
| align=center| 3–0
| Joe Serna
| Verbal Submission (knee injury)
| RMBB: Nuclear Assault
| 
| align=center| 2
| align=center| 0:50
| Sheridan, Colorado, United States
| 
|-
| Win
| align=center| 2–0
| Gary Borum
| TKO (punches)
| Kickdown Classic 35
| 
| align=center| 1
| align=center| 3:19
| Denver, Colorado, United States
| 
|-
| Win
| align=center| 1–0
| Damon Clark
| TKO (punches)
| Kickdown Classic 27
| 
| align=center| 1
| align=center| 3:03
| Denver, Colorado, United States
|

Mixed martial arts exhibition record

|-
| Win
| align=center| 1–0
| Victor O'Donnell
| Decision (unanimous)
| The Ultimate Fighter: Team Liddell vs. Team Ortiz
|  (air date)
| align=center| 3
| align=center| 5:00
| Las Vegas, Nevada
|

Kickboxing record

Bare knuckle boxing record

|-
|Win
|align=center|1–0
|Bubba McDaniel	
|KO (punch)
|BKFC 31
|
|align=center|1
|align=center|0:37
|Broomfield, Colorado, United States
|

See also
 List of kickboxers
 List of male mixed martial artists

References

External links
 Chris Camozzi at PFL
 
 
 Chris Camozzi at Glory Kickboxing

American male mixed martial artists
Middleweight mixed martial artists
Mixed martial artists utilizing Muay Thai
Mixed martial artists utilizing wrestling
Mixed martial artists utilizing Brazilian jiu-jitsu
Living people
1986 births
American practitioners of Brazilian jiu-jitsu
Mixed martial artists from California
People from Alameda, California
American Muay Thai practitioners
Ultimate Fighting Championship male fighters
American male kickboxers